Newport '61 is a live album by Quincy Jones that was recorded on July 3, 1961, at the Newport Jazz Festival.

Track listing 
 "Meet B.B." (Quincy Jones) – 3:58
 "Boy in the Tree" (Jones) – 5:01
 "Evening in Paris" (Jones) – 5:11
 "Air Mail Special" (Charlie Christian, Benny Goodman, Jimmy Mundy) – 4:25
 "Lester Leaps In" (Lester Young) – 6:10
 "G'won Train" (Patricia Bown) – 6:02
 "Banja Luka" (Phil Woods) – 5:54
 "Ghana" (Ernie Wilkins) – 4:06

Personnel 
 Quincy Jones - arranger, conductor
 Phil Woods, Joe Lopes - alto saxophone
 Jerome Richardson, Eric Dixon - flute, tenor saxophone
 Pat Patrick - baritone saxophone
 Jimmy Nottingham, Jimmy Maxwell, John Bello, Joe Newman - trumpet
 Julius Watkins - French horn
 Curtis Fuller, Melba Liston, Britt Woodman, Paul Faulise - trombone
 Les Spann - flute, guitar
 Patricia Bown - piano
 Art Davis - double bass
 Stu Martin - drums

References 

1961 live albums
1961 in Rhode Island
Quincy Jones live albums
Albums arranged by Quincy Jones
Albums recorded at the Newport Jazz Festival
Mercury Records live albums
Albums produced by Quincy Jones
Albums conducted by Quincy Jones